The Scord of Brouster is one of the earliest Neolithic farm sites in Shetland, Scotland. It has been dated to 2220 BC with a time window of 80 years on either side. It comprises three houses, several fields surrounded by walls, and a cairn. A sign by the Scord of Brouster states that the climate of Shetland became wetter towards 1500 BC, and that peat forming near the fields eventually forced the farmers to permanently abandon the site. The site was excavated by Alasdair Whittle in the late 1970s, because he wanted investigate on early agricultural settlement in Britain in a remote part of the country, unspoilt by modern development.

Site 
The Scord of Brouster has three oval-shaped houses. It has an entrance at its southeastern end and six recesses.

Artefacts 
In all, nearly ten thousand pieces of quartz were found at the Scord of Brouster. 5688 stone artefacts were found in house one, 3772 stone artefacts were found in house two, and only 227 stone artefacts were found in house three. Of the 227 items found in house three, 225 are merely quartz flakes and chips. These pieces were found in what appears to be three phases: prior to the construction of the buildings, during active use, and during abandonment.

House one 
Before this house was built, most of the artefacts were scattered across the southern portion of the building's area. After the construction of the house, the centre of the building had far fewer quartz artefacts. Instead, the artefacts were concentrated in places inside the house beside the walls. In the final phase, most stone pieces were found by the walls of the house.

House two 
Both prior to construction and during its use, the artefacts were mostly concentrated on the western side and near the central fireplace. The eastern side had very few artefacts, and a recess in the northeast corner had even fewer, which led the archaeologists to believe that it may have been a sleeping area. After abandonment, the artefacts were scattered relatively evenly across the entire area.

The second house contained only about three-fourths the number of tool artefacts that the first house did. However, they had nearly identical percentages of types of tools found. For example, house one contained 91 scrapers compared to the 69 found in house two, but that corresponds to 75% of the artefacts found in house one and 77% of the artefacts found in house two.

House three 
Relatively few artefacts were found in the third house, so there was no real way for the researchers to discover any concentrations of artefacts.

See also 

 Neolithic Europe
 Stone Age

References 

Archaeological sites in Shetland
Neolithic settlements
Neolithic Scotland
23rd century BC
Scheduled monuments in Scotland
Mainland, Shetland